The Essex County Schools of Technology (formerly known as Essex County Vocational Technical Schools) is a regional public school district headquartered in Newark that offers occupational and academic instruction for public high school and adult students in Essex County, New Jersey, United States. Founded in 1914, the district is one of the state's largest and oldest vocational education system.

As of the 2020–21 school year, the district, comprised of three schools, had an enrollment of 2,340 students and 181.0 classroom teachers (on an FTE basis), for a student–teacher ratio of 12.9:1.

All high schools provide academic and occupational programs for ninth through twelfth grades, offering both full and shared time to both general education and special needs students.

It has been announced by ECVTS the opening of the newly constructed Donald M. Payne Sr. School of Technology in Newark, NJ will be in September 2018. The newly built school will serve as the home of current students from Bloomfield Tech and North 13th Street as ECVTS will close both sites.

Awards and recognition
During the 2009-10 school year, Bloomfield Tech High School was awarded the National Blue Ribbon School Award of Excellence by the United States Department of Education, the highest award an American school can receive.

During the 2012-13 academic year, West Caldwell Tech High School was recognized as a Blue Ribbon School Award of Excellence by the U.S. Department of Education, one of 17 schools in the state to receive the award that year.

In 2015, both Bloomfield Tech and Newark Tech were recognized with the National Blue Ribbon School Award of Excellence.

Schools
The district consists of the following three high schools (with 2020–21 enrollment data from the National Center for Education Statistics), which are:
Donald M. Payne Sr. School of Technology in Newark, with 1,291 students in grades 9-12
Eric Love, Principal
Emily Bonilla, Vice Principal
Anibal Ponce, Vice Principal
Newark Tech High School in Newark,  with 716 students in grades 9-12
Carmen Morales, Principal
Jenabu C. Williams, Vice Principal
West Caldwell Tech in West Caldwell, with 336 students in grades 9-12
Ayisha Ingram-Robinson, Principal

The district offers adult programs in the evening at the Newark Tech and Donald M. Payne Tech centers.

Defunct schools
Bloomfield Tech High School in Bloomfield (Closed)
North 13th Street Tech in Newark (Closed)

Administration
Core members of the district's administration are:
Dr. James Pedersen, Superintendent of Schools
Bernetta Davis, Business Administrator / Board Secretary

Board of education
A board of education comprised of seven members is appointed by the Essex County Board of County Commissioners.

References

External links
Essex County Vocational Technical Schools

School Data for the Essex County Vocational Technical Schools, National Center for Education Statistics

Newark, New Jersey
School districts in Essex County, New Jersey
Vocational school districts in New Jersey